The Central Food Technological Research Institute (CFTRI) is an Indian food research institute and laboratory headquartered in Mysore, India. It is a constituent laboratory of the Council of Scientific and Industrial Research.

India is the world's second largest food grain, fruit and vegetable producer, and the institute is engaged in research in the production and handling of grains, pulses, oilseed, along with spices, fruits, vegetables, meat, fish, and poultry.

Establishment 
CFTRI was established on 21 October 1950, soon after the Dominion of India was constituted into a republic, under the Council of Scientific and Industrial Research, a research and development organisation co-founded by Sir A. R. Mudaliyar.

Maharaja Jayachamaraja Wadiyar donated Cheluvambavilas Palace and its vast campus to house the institute, where it is headquartered. It also has its resource centres at Hyderabad, Lucknow, and Mumbai, rendering technical assistance to numerous entrepreneurs.

Institute 
The institute has nearly two hundred scientists, technologists, and engineers, and over a hundred technicians, skilled workers, and support staff. There are sixteen research and development departments, including laboratories focussing on food engineering, food biotechnology, microbiology, grain sciences, sensory science, biochemistry, molecular nutrition, and food safety.

The institute has developed over 300 products, processes, and equipment designs, and most of these technologies have been released to over 4000 licensees for commercial application. . The institute develops technologies to increase efficiency and reduce post-harvest losses, add convenience, increase export, find new sources of food products, integrate human resources in food industries, reduce costs, and modernise. It holds several patents and has published findings in reputed journals.

Notes

External links

https://web.archive.org/web/20130115030611/http://www.csir.res.in/External/Heads/aboutcsir/lab_directory.htm
http://www.knowindia.net/agro.html
http://businessworld.in/article/We-Are-Changing-And-So-Is-Our-Food/28-12-2016-110384/

Research institutes in Mysore
Food science institutes
Council of Scientific and Industrial Research
Food and drink in India
1950 establishments in India
Research institutes established in 1950